The Fernando Alonso Sports Complex (also known as ) is a sports project dedicated to the promotion of motorsport and a memorial to Fernando Alonso, a two-times Formula One World Drivers' Champion from Oviedo, Asturias, Spain. The facility is located in Llanera, Asturias.

Facilities 
The complex includes a museum about Fernando Alonso, a kart circuit, and a golf course.

Museum 
The complex's Fernando Alonso Collection includes most of the racing cars which Alonso has competed in since the age of 3, racing suits and helmets he wore, and the trophies which he won. Apart from those originating from Alonso himself, his helmet collection of other professional drivers is on exhibit.

 Notable collection
 All Formula One cars which Alonso raced before  including the championship winning Renault R25 and R26 and the 2018 McLaren MCL33 with the special Abu Dhabi livery
 Renault RS25 engine from the 2005 Formula One season
 2017 McLaren-Honda-Andretti Dallara DW12. Which Alonso drove in the 2017 Indianapolis 500.
2018 Toyota TS050 Hybrid in which he won that season's 24h of Le Mans

Kart circuit 

The karting circuit is spread over 44,446.54 m² and was designed and built with the possibility of making twenty-nine different tracks, whose lengths vary between 1,400 and 1,800 meters. The main circuit can be divided into three secondary courses of 721, 637 and 372 meters to facilitate training. It is approved to host international competitions at the highest level according to CIK-FIA standards.

The circuit was premiered by Fernando Alonso himself on March 18, 2011, in front of 4,000 people.

References

External links 
 Fernando Alonso official website

Fernando Alonso
Tourist attractions in Asturias
Museums in Asturias
Sports venues in Asturias
2011 establishments in Spain
Automobile museums in Spain
Sports museums in Spain
Auto racing museums and halls of fame
Museums established in 2011
Motorsport venues in Asturias
Kart circuits